A vegan school meal or vegan school lunch or vegan school dinner or vegan hot lunch is a vegan option provided as a school meal. The meals have become part of the menu in some public school districts. Vegan school meals most reported on by the media include those added by Los Angeles, California in 2018, Portland, Maine in 2019, and New York City in 2022. A small number of private educational facilities around the world are vegan schools and serve exclusively vegan food.

Background 
Traditionally school meals, particularly those served in the United States and Europe, are made with meat and dairy. In recent years schools there and in other geographic regions have begun adding vegan and plant-based options.

Culture, politics and government policies determine what food is served at school meals, and schools serving vegan meals are often responding to national policies or demands from local communities. Reasons cited for offering vegan school meals include concerns about nutrition, allergies, cultural diversity and sustainability. Schools that add vegan lunch have faced complaints and those that don't have it have faced criticism.

The addition of vegan lunches in schools is related to the Meatless Monday campaign.

In 2006, Vegetarian Journal reported a survey of food service directors in the United States by the School Nutrition Association found "5% of elementary, 6% of middle, and 10% of high schools offer vegan options." By 2017, the School Nutrition Association found 14% of school districts across the country offer vegan lunches compared to 11.5% of schools offering vegan lunch in 2016.

Political history 
In 2011 France passed a law requiring schools to serve meat. Then in 2017 French Environment Minister Nicolas Hulot told a publication schools should serve vegan meals.

In 2016, the Israel Ministry of Health mandated all schools serve weekly vegetarian meals, some of which are vegan.

In Berlin, Germany in 2016, an administrative court ruled schools aren't obligated to provide vegan school meals.

In 2017, Brazil adopted the Conscious Eating Brazil policy (Alimentação Consciente Brasil) with an aim of increasing fruits and vegetables and decreasing meat in the country's school lunches. The act led to some school districts adding vegan meals.

In 2019, the Healthy Climate-Friendly School Lunch Act, which would mandate vegan options in all schools, was introduced into the state of California's legislature in the United States.

The United Kingdom's School Food Standards require school meals to include fish, meat, and dairy. In 2020, Paul McCartney signed a letter to education secretary Gavin Williamson asking that the government change the requirement and allow schools to serve vegetarian and vegan meals. The campaign to change the UK School Food Standards is led by People for the Ethical Treatment of Animals and supporters include Greenpeace and the Royal Society for Public Health. In 2022, the Oxfordshire County Council voted to provide vegan meals in schools two days a week and farmers protested.

Examples of vegan lunches 
Vegan school lunches being served by schools include sloppy Joes in Teofilandia, Brazil, hummus pizza and Kung Pao tofu in Portland, Maine, USA, root vegetable soup in Porvoo, Finland, vegan chicken nuggets in Deerfield, Illinois, USA, vegan quesadillas and Sichuan noodles in Kittery, Maine, USA, falafel sandwiches and stuffed vegan peppers at Fort Walton Beach, Florida, USA, and vegan tamale and vegan teriyaki burgers in Los Angeles, California, USA. At Our Lady of Sion School in Worthing, West Sussex, England school dinners include Fillet Fisch burger with tartare sauce & chips, butternut squash & sweet potato Tikka Masala with rice, and tofu tacos with Asian slaw.

In 2022, New York City public schools adopted Vegan Fridays and serve vegan lunches on Fridays. These include chickpea wraps and veggie tacos.

Vegan schools 
Vegan schools are schools that only serve vegan food to students.

In 2015, the MUSE School in Calabasas, California became the first vegan K–12 school in the United States. 

The German International School in Chennai also adopted veganism since the 2017–2018 academic year, becoming the first vegan K–12 school in India.

In February 2022, the Our Lady of Sion School, an independent day school in Worthing, West Sussex, England, became the first school in the country to have a fully vegan school kitchen. It partners with Plant Based School Kitchens.

The Student Union at the University of Stirling in Stirling, Scotland, voted in 2022 to become a vegan university. The university, with about 17,000 students, will become 50% vegan for the 2023-2024 academic year and 100% vegan by 2025.

Influence 
The concern over climate change is causing more governments to lower emissions, including serving food with the least climate footprint. Friends of the Earth said vegan school meals are beneficial for the planet, for the health of students and for the finances of the school system. But in many school districts, the meat and dairy lobby retains its power, and in the United States schools are required to serve and promote cow's milk. Those advocating for vegan lunch include Sir Paul McCartney, New York City Mayor Eric Adams, journalist Avery Yale Kamila, environmental advocate Suzy Amis Cameron, the Physician's Committee for Responsible Medicine, The Vegan Society and the Humane Society's Forward Food programme.

See also 

 Meat-free Days
 Meatless Monday
 Veganuary
 World Vegan Day

References 

Academic meals
Vegan cuisine